Matthew Anthony Maslowski (born September 10, 1949) is a former American football wide receiver who played for the Los Angeles Rams and Chicago Bears of the National Football League (NFL). He also played for Florida Blazers of the (WFL). He played college football at University of San Diego.

Personal life
Maslowski is of Polish descent.

References 

1949 births
Living people
Players of American football from Chicago
American football wide receivers
American people of Polish descent
San Diego Toreros football players
Los Angeles Rams players
Chicago Bears players
Florida Blazers players